The 2014–15 season was Fulham's 117th professional season and first in the Championship under its current name and the first in the division since 2001. Fulham took one point from their first eight games, effectively writing off any chance of promotion. Fulham temporarily rescued their season by means of sacking Felix Magath and appointing Kit Symons. The resulting run of form led to play-off aspirations, before a poor run of form at the beginning of 2015 led to worries about a second consecutive relegation. However, Fulham only lost one of their last six games, which kept them safe at the expense of Millwall, Wigan Athletic, and Blackpool.

Much hype occurred surrounding the £11,000,000 signing of 2013–14 Championship top scorer Ross McCormack, who scored 17 goals in the league, 19 in total. Fulham also competed in the League Cup, reaching the fourth round, and the FA Cup, also reaching the fourth round.

Season review

August
For Fulham's first game, against Ipswich Town, Felix Magath fielded eight debutants, including five in the back line, in the starting eleven. Only Scott Parker, Moussa Dembélé, and Chris David, the lack of experience showed Fulham conceded a corner after just 17 seconds as Ipswich created the early chances. Fulham almost capitalised on an error by Dean Gerken when the Ipswich goalkeeper fumbled David's 20-yard shot but he made amends to deny Dembélé with his legs. Although Fulham were enjoying the majority of possession, Ipswich continued to create chances, and it was the hosts who broke the deadlock in the 32nd minute when Luke Hyam's incisive through ball released Daryl Murphy, who outpaced Shaun Hutchinson before making no mistake with a powerful finish. Ipswich doubled their advantage on 62 minutes: Murphy was again too strong for Hutchinson on the left wing and, while his low cross was half cleared, it fell perfectly for David McGoldrick. It was now comfortable for the hosts with Fulham looking a beaten outfit well before the final whistle. Anthony Wordsworth should have added a third 11 minutes from time when he headed over from ten yards following excellent work from McGoldrick and Luke Chambers. McGoldrick called Jesse Joronen into action from the corner of the penalty area after yet more tenacious play by Jay Tabb, before Fulham pulled a goal back out of nothing: Tim Hoogland cut inside Tyrone Mings and his weak shot took a wicked deflection off the body of Tommy Smith to take it past Gerken's near post. The lifeline galvanised Fulham and another deflection almost gave substitute Patrick Roberts an equaliser, but Ipswich held on to claim all three points.

Felix Magath dropped £11,000,000 signing Ross McCormack to the bench after claiming that the former Leeds striker was not fully fit, causing Soccer Saturday presenter Jeff Stelling to query why Magath was not selecting McCormack, Kostas Mitroglou, or Bryan Ruiz, whose total transfer fees were £32,000,000. Hugo Rodallega returned, one of four changes following the 2–1 opening-day defeat away to Ipswich. In the 12th minute, there seemed little danger as Ricardo Fuller crossed from the left, but Fulham captain Scott Parker's attempt to head clear only flicked the ball away from his stranded goalkeeper, Jesse Joronen, and into the path of Martyn Woolford, who scored with ease, causing a furious argument between Parker and Joronen. Fulham looked for a reply. The energetic young home side often had Millwall at full stretch as they played short passes at speed but defenders produced a series of blocks to deny the hosts. Scott Malone almost scored a second goal for Millwall with a dipping volley after 36 minutes, but Joronen did well to palm it over the crossbar. Magath sent on McCormack after the interval and he almost created the equaliser in the 47th minute, his pass giving Rodallega the chance to send Forde sprawling to save a low shot. But Joronen had to rescue his team again in the 57th minute, blocking Malone's shot with his right foot after Scott McDonald had created the opening. Just before the hour, Parker slipped a pass to McCormack that seemed to have provided his first goal for Fulham. But Forde was equal to the shot although Fulham, galvanised by McCormack, were getting closer. Rodallega's shot on the turn beat Forde but Dunne cleared the ball from the goalline. And then Forde blocked again from McCormack after he had bustled past Mark Beevers, and Millwall held on to keep Fulham on no points.

Magath pleaded before the match against Wolverhampton Wanderers for the fans to be patient with his young team – he made five changes to the side beaten by Millwall and started with six players aged 21 or younger. Wolves tore into Fulham from the off, with Dave Edwards flashing an early shot across goal and wide and Jesse Joronen having to charge out of his goal to save at the feet of Rajiv van la Parra. But on 15 minutes, Scott Golbourne's low corner was dummied by Edwards and allowed to run all the way to Bakary Sako, who drilled it into the bottom corner, with Mark Fotheringham wandering off the post which he was marking. Fulham tried to respond and Kostas Stafylidis fired narrowly over and then put in a dangerous cross which Tim Hoogland could not get a clean header on. But they almost found themselves two down before the interval when Wolves skipper Danny Batth got his head to Sako's free-kick only to nod the ball inches wide. Magath's response was to throw on another youngster, Dembélé, and the 18-year-old almost made an instant impact with a low shot which Carl Ikeme tipped around his post. But with Ross McCormack again isolated up front - the £11,000,000 striker resorted to coming back and collecting the ball from his centre-halves during the second half - Fulham rarely threatened an equaliser. The Scot's one sight of goal arrived just before the hour mark and his drive from the edge of the area was always rising as it cleared Ikeme's crossbar. Instead it was Wolves who always looked like adding to their tally, with Matt Doherty and Batth both missing the target with close-range headers before Sako blew their best chance in stoppage time, hitting the post with a penalty after Cameron Burgess tripped Nouha Dicko. Throughout the second half and after the full-time whistle, "Felix out" could be heard amongst the Fulham fans, and Magath did not acknowledge the fans when walking off, as Fulham slipped into the bottom three.

Crucially, Fulham made only one change from the much-maligned team that had lost against Wolverhampton: Derby had a chance in the third minute when Cyrus Christie found Johnny Russell just inside the area, but the Scot volleyed over. Parker's measured passing got the Londoners moving but Derby had another opening in the 13th minute when the ball dropped invitingly to Christie, but he shot straight at Jesse Joronen from 15 yards. Fulham were being stretched by Derby's movement, and in the 23rd minute they were behind when Russell crossed from the right and Jamie Ward steered a volley from eight yards into the roof of the net. Fulham needed a spark of inspiration, and Ross McCormack nearly supplied it in the 37th minute with a shot from just inside his own half which Lee Grant had to back-pedal to take under his crossbar. Fulham had created little but they were level in the 54th minute when McCormack chipped the ball in and Ryan Williams laid it to Parker who placed a low shot from 15 yards inside Grant's right post. It stung Derby into a rousing response that brought them two goals in three minutes to leave Fulham sliding to another defeat. First, Jeff Hendrick played in Russell on the left in the 59th minute and his ball back across was swept past Joronen by Craig Bryson. Fulham's defence was exposed again in the 61st minute when Chris Martin was allowed to turn just inside the right side of the area and the striker arrowed a low shot across the keeper for his first Championship goal of the season. The closing minutes were a nightmare for Fulham as Martin tapped in after Simon Dawkins hit a post in the 87th minute, before Fulham conceded straight from the kick-off to leave the travelling supporters chanting "Felix out" once again.

Fulham hit their first win after beating Brentford 1–0 at Griffin Park in the League Cup in the first competitive meeting between the sides since 1998. The win gave Fulham momentum for the game against Cardiff City. However, on the eve of the game, former chairman Mohamed Al Fayed had labelled Magath an "odd man", while also taking a swipe at "absent landlord" Shahid Khan. However, Fulham started brightly: Ross McCormack curled wide a first-time effort, and in the 22nd minute, Parker played the ball wide to McCormack on the left, with the forward's cross glanced across the goalkeeper by Hoogland. McCormack hit a post direct from a corner five minutes later and Emerson Hyndman powered wide as the hosts upped the ante, with the impressive Chris David twice wasting free-kicks from decent positions. The hosts were made to rue a series of missed chances in the 55th minute when Kenwyne Jones shrugged off his man to win a header and collected the return ball from Mats Daelhi to slot home. It finished 1–1, and at the final whistle, there were boos from pockets of Fulham fans.

September
Against Reading, Fulham had begun brightly, with Ross McCormack volleying over from close range after a header from debutante Matt Smith. But they went behind in the 15th minute from Reading's first meaningful attack, led by Jordan Obita along the left flank. Obita crossed early and Glenn Murray dived forward to head in from close range for his first goal for the club. Three minutes later, it got worse for Fulham. Smith went in late and high on a Reading player and referee Mike Jones issued the red card immediately. Reading swiftly assumed control. Gábor Király, on his Fulham debut, was in action multiple times, but the pressure inevitably told, with a second goal arriving in the 54th minute when Murray nodded in a precise corner from Obita from close range. It was too much for the 2,745 Fulham fans, who voiced their displeasure at manager Magath: "You're getting sacked in the morning" was followed by further choruses of "Felix out". Then Király tipped a header from home substitute Pavel Pogrebnyak – a former Fulham player – against the crossbar and Taylor drove narrowly wide from distance. But Fulham could not hold out at 2–0 until the end. In the 85th minute, substitute Blackman ran through, went by Király and slotted the ball home. Fulham's misery was complete.

In a bid to arrest his side's slump, Magath made five changes to his Fulham starting XI, with Kostas Stafylidis, Shaun Hutchinson, Mark Fotheringham and Hugo Rodallega all returning, while Fernando Amorebieta was handed his first outing of the campaign. The resulting formation caused the commentator on BBC Radio 5 Live Sports Extra to announce that Fulham had so many centre backs he had no idea of the formation: Fulham played six defenders in a 6–1–1–1–1 formation. Despite a bright early start, it took just nine minutes for Fulham to get that familiar sinking feeling as Forest took the lead with their first attack of the game. Antonio was upended by Nikolay Bodurov and, from Henri Lansbury's whipped-in free-kick, Britt Assombalonga rose to head powerfully past Gábor Király. Assombalonga increased Fulham's woes from the penalty spot after 20 minutes. Antonio's brilliant run into the visitors' area was crudely halted by Hutchinson, who was duly booked – as was Dan Burn, who manhandled referee Darren Deadman – and Assombalonga fired his kick into the bottom corner. The Fulham manager sat motionless by the dugout as chants of "Felix out" rang out from the small pocket of Cottagers supporters situated behind Király's goal. But just past the hour mark, Jack Hunt's foul on Stafylidis presented £11 million-man McCormack with a free shot on goal, and he hauled Fulham back into the match by delivering a stunning set-piece past the despairing dive of Darlow for his first league goal for the Cottagers. Rodallega should have levelled as he latched on to a through ball, but as he rounded Darlow and shot goalwards, a defender rushed back to clear off the line. Bodurov fired over when unmarked in the Forest box as Fulham came out with renewed vigour, and their early energy was rewarded when Amorebieta's cross was smartly diverted home by Rodallega. Amazingly, Fulham grabbed the lead after 64 minutes, with McCormack firing the Londoners ahead following a three-man move between himself, Rodallega and substitute Chris David. But Forest awoke from their slumber to restore parity after 77 minutes as Antonio latched on to a brilliant pass from skipper Michael Mancienne to crack home a shot into the corner. And after looking almost dead and buried, Forest suddenly found themselves ahead two minutes later when Assombalonga's header hit a post, but he reacted quickest to stab the ball home. Forest then sealed victory in the 89th minute when Paterson ran through on goal to calmly dispatch the ball past Kiraly from 15 yards.

That proved to be enough for Shahid Khan to sack Magath, and announced that Kit Symons would temporarily assume caretaker manager whilst he appointed a five-man committee to find a new manager. Symons's first game in charge was against Blackburn Rovers. Symons made three changes – including Bryan Ruiz's first Fulham appearance since December 2013 – for a match attended by former captain Brede Hangeland, as well with former fan favourite Steve Sidwell, but as half-time approached, Hutchinson launched into an ill-advised, over-zealous challenge on Lee Williamson, leaving the midfielder in a heap. Referee Andy D'Urso gave a straight red card and, after several minutes of treatment, the Rovers man left the field on a stretcher. The sending off gave Rovers the upper hand and Rudy Gestede's attempt to find an opener at the start of the second half had to be well saved by the returning Marcus Bettinelli. Fulham soon had to scramble away a Craig Conway free-kick, before eventually falling behind in the 58th minute. Fulham refused to give in, though, and an excellent counter-attack involving Parker and Tim Hoogland would have been turned in by Ross McCormack was it not for a fine Steele save. Ruiz and Rodallega saw penalty appeals waved away soon after, before Blackburn came close in quick succession as Dan Burn blocked a Rhodes effort after rounding Bettinelli before a Gestede header deflected just wide.

Fulham then progressed in the League Cup after seeing off Doncaster Rovers, courtesy of Bryan Ruiz and Dan Burn goals. This boosted morale for the trip to Saint Andrew's for the game against Birmingham City, who had only won one of their last 23 games at home. Fulham hardly began as a bottom of the table side, as demonstrated by Ross McCormack when he flashed in a free-kick which Darren Randolph had to desperately finger-tip away to safety. But it was Birmingham who then took command and David Cotterill, who had created numerous goal opportunities throughout the season, found himself in a goalscoring position when he latched onto a pass from Mark Duffy only to screw his effort wide with only goalkeeper Marcus Bettinelli to beat. Fulham's problem was highlighted in the 19th minute when the industrious McCormack produced an accurate cross from the right only for Rodallega to fail to make a clean contact just yards away from the Birmingham goal. Birmingham continued to benefit from Cotterill's good delivery and another chance went begging as David Edgar headed wide from the former Burnley player's corner kick. Finally, in the 37th minute, they finally broke the stalemate with a solo goal. Callum Reilly pushed a pass into the path of Cotterill. He looked up and decided to fire in a shot from fully 25 yards which whistled into the top far corner of the net. Fulham were boosted by a 63rd-minute equaliser from Hoogland: Nikolay Bodurov's cross was deflected to Hoogland who saw his shot also deflected into the net. The winner came courtesy of a bad mistake by Jonathan Spector. He attempted to push the ball back to his goalkeeper only for the ball to cannon to Rodallega to capitalise upon the mistake and score with an angled shot after 71 minutes to give the whites their first win of the season in the League.

Transfers

In

Loans in

Out

Loans out

Fixtures and results

Pre-season friendlies

Friendlies during season

Championship

The fixtures for the 2014–15 season were announced on 18 June 2014 at 9:00 am.

Results summary

Results by matchday

Football League Cup
Fulham were granted a bye in to the second round of the League Cup.

FA Cup

Fulham were granted a bye into the third round of the FA Cup.

Competitions

Overall

Championship table

Squad statistics

Appearances & goals
Last updated 2 May 2015

Players listed with no appearances have been in the matchday squad but only as unused substitutes.

|-
|colspan="12"|Players who left the club during the season

|-
|colspan="12"|Out on loan
|-

|}

Top scorers
Includes all competitive matches. The list is sorted by squad number when total goals are equal.

Last updated on 2 May 2015

Disciplinary record
Includes all competitive matches. The list is sorted by shirt number.

|-
|colspan=17 style="text-align:center;" |Players who left the club during the season
|-

|-
|colspan=17 style="text-align:center;" |Out on loan
|-

|-
|colspan=4|TOTALS
|69
|2
|5
|4
|0
|0
|8
|0
|0
|81
|2
|5
|

Suspensions

References

Fulham F.C. seasons
Fulham FC Season, 2014-15
Fulham
2015 sports events in London